The Muskingum County Courthouse is a historic building in Zanesville, Ohio. It was designed by T.B. Townsend and H. E. Myer, and built in 1870 with stone, brick, and slate in the Second Empire architecture style. The building is listed on the National Register of Historic Places and is located at 4th and Main Streets. 

The site served as the capitol of Ohio from October 1, 1810, until May 1, 1812, and the 9th and 10th sessions of the Ohio General Assembly met here at the building that was formerly at the site before those sessions were returned to Chillicothe in May 1812. The former building on the site was then used as the Muskingum County Courthouse until current one was constructed in 1874. The 1809 date stone from the old building was incorporated into the new building and may be seen over the front steps.

Townsend was also involved in the building of the third Tuscarawas County Courthouse designed by architect Thomas Boyd and Wood County Courthouse and Jail.

References

Government buildings completed in 1877
County courthouses in Ohio
Italianate architecture in Ohio
Courthouses on the National Register of Historic Places in Ohio
National Register of Historic Places in Muskingum County, Ohio
Buildings and structures in Zanesville, Ohio
Clock towers in Ohio
1877 establishments in Ohio